Saint Margaret Island lies in Corner Inlet, in the Gippsland region of Victoria, Australia.  It lies at the eastern end of the Nooramunga Marine and Coastal Park, close to Ninety Mile Beach.

References

Islands of Victoria (Australia)
Gippsland (region)